Abraham Lincoln's health has been the subject of both contemporaneous commentary and subsequent hypotheses by historians and scholars. Until middle age, his health was fairly good for the time. He contracted malaria in 1830 and 1835; the latter was the worse of the two cases. He contracted smallpox in 1863 during an 1863 to 1864 epidemic in Washington, D.C.

Throughout his life he experienced periods of depression, which could be genetic, due to life experiences or trauma, or both. Lincoln took blue mass pills, which contained mercury. Based on his behavior and physical condition while taking the pills and after he quit taking them, Lincoln may have suffered from mercury poisoning. It has been theorized that Lincoln had Marfan syndrome or, more likely, Multiple endocrine neoplasia type 2B, both rare genetic diseases.

Health and trauma

Despite the following occurrences, Lincoln's health up until middle age was fairly good for his day.

Trauma
When he was nine years old, Lincoln was kicked in the head by a horse at the Noah Gordon Mill and was knocked unconscious for several hours. Other injuries or trauma throughout his life include almost severing one of his thumbs with an axe, incurring frostbite of his feet in 1830–1831, being struck by his wife (apparently on multiple occasions), and being clubbed on the head during a robbery attempt in 1828. Lincoln was assassinated in 1865, dying from a bullet wound.

Infectious disease

 Malaria: Lincoln had malaria at least twice. The first was in 1830, along with the rest of his family.  They had just arrived in Illinois that year. The second episode was in the summer of 1835, while living in New Salem. Lincoln was then so ill that he was sent to a neighbor's house to be medicated and cared for.
 Smallpox: November 18, 1863, while at the dedication of the Soldiers' National Cemetery, Lincoln was quite ill with smallpox. Long thought to have been only a mild case, recent work suggests it was a serious illness. Although it did not debilitate Lincoln, the disease did significantly affect his White House routine, and limited the advisors with whom he could meet.  While caring for him, Lincoln's valet William H. Johnson contracted the disease and ultimately died in January 1864. Lincoln arranged and paid for Johnson to be buried. Some sources state his grave is at Arlington National Cemetery, but some recent investigators have argued that this is not the case.

Mental health
Lincoln was contemporaneously described as suffering from melancholy, a condition which modern mental health professionals would characterize as clinical depression. Lincoln suffered depressed mood after major traumatic events, such as the death of Ann Rutledge in August 1835, the cessation of his (purported) engagement to Mary Todd Lincoln in January 1841 (after which several close associates feared Lincoln's suicide), and after the Second Battle of Bull Run. During his life Lincoln experienced the death of multiple close family members, including his mother, his sister, and two of his sons, Eddie and Willie. Mary Lincoln felt her husband to be too trusting, and his melancholy tended to strike at times he was betrayed or unsupported by those in whom he put faith. Whether he may have suffered from depression as a genetic predilection, as a reaction to multiple emotional traumas in his life, or a combination thereof is the subject of much current conjecture.

Lincoln often combated his melancholic moods by delving into works of humor, likely a healthy coping mechanism for his depression.

Medication

The recollections of Lincoln's legal colleagues (John T. Stuart, Henry Clay Whitney, Ward Hill Lamon, and William Herndon) all agree that Lincoln took blue mass pills, which were commonly prescribed for hypochondriasis and melancholia. It has been used since the 16th century to treat syphilis and by the mid-19th century was prescribed for a wide variety of ills. The active ingredient of blue mass is elemental mercury – a substance now known to be a neurotoxin in its valproic state and has been known to be poisonous for centuries.

Lincoln may have taken the blue mass pills for constipation, as well as hypochondriasis, or what has been called persistent constipation-melancholia complex. Both conditions were well known by his friends and family to have significantly affected Lincoln throughout his life.

Authors of Abraham Lincoln's Blue Pills: Did Our 16th President Suffer from Mercury Poisoning? find that it is a reasonable assumption that Lincoln had experienced mercury poisoning due to the differences in his behavior and physical condition when he was taking the blue mass pills versus when he stopped taking the pills. When he was taking the blue mass pills, he was prone to outbursts of rage, bizarre behavior, memory loss, and insomnia. His hands trembled when he was under stress. Taking the medicine made Lincoln feel "cross". These issues, described in detail by those who were close to him, are common symptoms of mercury poisoning. When he stopped taking the medicine, and during a period of profound personal and professional stress, he "behaves like a saint". Lincoln may also have had long-term effects as the result of mercury poisoning, such as nerve damage that affected his gait.

Shortly after his 1861 inauguration, Lincoln had a sudden and disquieting outburst of rage during a White House conversation. Finding that the blue mass pills made him "cross", Lincoln stopped taking them about August 1861 (5 months after his March inauguration). Then his anger greatly diminished, so much so that he rarely expressed anger and then only when it was situationally appropriate.

Body habitus

The habitus, or structure, of Lincoln's body attracted attention while he was alive, and continues to attract attention today among medical professionals.
 Height: as a child, Lincoln was tall, describing himself as "though very young, he was large of his age." He reached his adult height of  no later than age 21.
 Weight: although well-muscled as a young adult, he was always thin. He is believed to have weighed even less during his presidency.

The theory that Lincoln's facial asymmetries were a manifestation of craniofacial microsomia has been replaced with a diagnosis of left synostotic frontal plagiocephaly, which is a type of craniosynostosis.

Genetic disorder theories
Several claims have been made that Lincoln's health was declining before the assassination. These are often based on photographs of Lincoln appearing to show weight loss and muscle wasting.  The theories are that he suffered from multiple endocrine neoplasia type 2B (MEN2B) or Marfan syndrome, rare genetic disorders.  DNA analysis of a pillowcase stained with Lincoln's blood, currently in possession of the Grand Army of the Republic Museum and Library in Philadelphia may be able to resolve open questions about Lincoln's health.

Marfan syndrome
Based on Lincoln's unusual physical appearance, Dr. Abraham Gordon proposed in 1962 that Lincoln had Marfan syndrome. Testing Lincoln's DNA for Marfan syndrome was contemplated in the 1990s, but such a test was not performed.

Lincoln's unremarkable cardiovascular history and his normal visual acuity have been the chief objections to the hypothesis, and today geneticists consider the diagnosis unlikely.

Multiple endocrine neoplasia type 2B

In 2007, Dr. John Sotos proposed that Lincoln had multiple endocrine neoplasia type 2B (MEN2B).  This hypothesis suggests Lincoln had all the major features of the disease: a marfanoid body shape, large, bumpy lips, constipation, hypotonia, a history compatible with cancer—to which Sotos ascribes the death of Lincoln's sons Eddie, Willie, and Tad, and probably his mother. The mole on Lincoln's right cheek, the asymmetry of his face, his large jaw, his drooping eyelid, and pseudodepression are also suggested as manifestations of MEN2B. MEN2B is a genetic disorder, and recently it has been demonstrated that Lincoln's biological mother, Nancy Lincoln, had many of the same unusual facial features as her son, as well as a marfanoid appearance.

Lincoln's longevity is the principal challenge to the MEN2B hypothesis: Lincoln lived long enough to be assassinated at age 56. Untreated MEN2B is generally understood to result in death by the patient's mid-thirties, but there are several reported cases of MEN2B patients surviving into their 50s with no or little treatment. The hypothesis could be proven by DNA testing.

Debunked theories

Syphilis
Claims that Lincoln had syphilis about 1835 have been controversial. Syphilis was a common worry among young men before the introduction of penicillin because syphilis was somewhat common in that era. Physicians likened the fear of syphilis, syphilophobia, to the modern fear of AIDS, which is also deadly and incurable.

Writing in 2003, biographer David Donald declared, "Modern physicians who have sifted the evidence agree that Lincoln never contracted the disease." For instance, he did not have any of the signs of tertiary syphilis. Physicians suggest that he had syphilophobia.

Spinocerebellar ataxia
The theory that Lincoln was afflicted with type 5 spinocerebellar ataxia is no longer accepted.

Notes

References

Bibliography

  Full-text index here.

External links
 

Abraham Lincoln
Lincoln, Abraham
Lincoln, Abraham